Subodh may refer to
Subodh Bhave, Marathi actor
Subodh Banarjee, Indian politician
Subodh Chandra Mallik, Indian industrialist
Subodh College, a college in Jaipur
Subodh Das (politician), Indian politician
Subodh Das, Indian scientist
Subodh Ghosh, Indian journalist
Subodh Gupta, Indian artist
Subodh Kant Sahay, Indian politician
Subodh Karnik, airline head
Subodh Khandekar, Indian hockey player
Subodh Mitra, Indian doctor
Subodh Patnaik, Indian scriptwriter
Subodh Patnaik (theatre director), Indian theatre director and playwright
Subodh Roy, Indian freedom fighter
Subodh Sarkar, Bengali poet
Subodh Sen, Indian politician
Subodh Srivastava, Indian costume designer
Subodh Oraon, Indian politician
Subodh Markandeya, Indian lawyer
Subodh Roy (politician), Indian politician